Wildert is a railway station in the village of Wildert, Essen, Belgium. The station opened on 13 November 1881 on the Antwerp–Lage Zwaluwe railway, known in Belgium as Line 12.

Train services
The station is served by the following services:

Local services (L-22) Roosendaal - Essen - Antwerp - Puurs (weekdays)
Local services (L-22) Roosendaal - Essen - Antwerp (weekends)

External links
Belgian Railways website

Railway stations opened in 1881
Railway stations in Belgium
Railway stations in Antwerp Province
Essen, Belgium
1881 establishments in Belgium